The Colonel By Classic is a Canadian rivalry hockey game between the University of Ottawa Gee-Gees and the Carleton University Ravens. The game has been held between men's teams since 2016, with a women's game added in 2018. Both men's teams compete in the East division of Ontario University Athletics and both women's compete in the Réseau du sport étudiant du Québec. The series is the newest of three annual rivalry series between the two schools, both located in the city of Ottawa.

History

The first Colonel By Classic was held on October 19, 2016 between the two men's hockey teams in front of at TD Place Arena. This was Gee-Gees first season back from their 2014–16 suspension. Carleton won the game 6–2. Attendance has gone up each year the event has been held, with 2,286 and 2,578 in attendance for the 2017 and 2018 men's games respectively.

A women's game was added to the event for the 2018 edition. Carleton won the inaugural women's game 5–2 at the University of Ottawa's Minto Sports Complex. The 2019 edition was held at the Carleton Ice House.

Game results

Men

Women

See also
 Capital Hoops Classic
 Panda Game

References

College sports rivalries in Canada
Ottawa Gee-Gees
Carleton Ravens
2016 establishments in Ontario
Carleton University
University of Ottawa